Curtice is a surname. Notable people with the surname include:

Harlow Curtice (1893–1962), American auto industry executive 
Jack Curtice (1907–1982), American football coach and college athletics administrator
John Curtice (born 1953), British political scientist

See also

 Curtis